The gulf of Castellammare is a large and deep natural inlet going from Capo Rama (near Terrasini, in the province of Palermo) and Capo San Vito near San Vito Lo Capo, in the province of Trapani. It is located on the western coast of Sicily and it faces the Tyrrhenian Sea.

History 
In the Roman period the gulf of Castellammare was called "Sinus Aegestanus", referring to the ancient town of Segesta, which still has some ruins (the temple and the theatre).

In 1714 it was called "golfo di Longuro or Longarico" by Guglielmo del'Isle in his geographical map, referring to the old town centre existing near the present Alcamo.

Municipalities 
Along the gulf from east to west are, in sequence, the communes of Terrasini, Trappeto, Balestrate, Alcamo, Castellammare del Golfo and San Vito Lo Capo. The small town of Castellammare del Golfo, which gives its name to the gulf itself, is in its centre.

In 2001 local governments constituted the association "Sviluppo del Golfo" (Gulf Development), and in its ambit they founded the "Patto Territoriale Golfo di Castellammare", an initiative by different local authorities and representatives of social and economic parties having as a scope the local development of the Gulf of Castellammare. In this agreement the participants are the municipalities of this gulf and those near it, various associations and the Banca Don Rizzo.
In 2010 they also formed the "Local Action Group Gulf of Castellammare", involving different communes, economic subjects, associations and professional organizations, to form a joint plan of local development for the territory of the Gulf of Castellammare.

Tourist attractions 

See also 

 Castellammare del Golfo
 Gulf of Macari

References 

Castellammare